Maurerberg or Mauerer Berg is a mountain on the border of Liechtenstein and Austria in the Rätikon range of the Eastern Alps to the southeast of the town of Schaanwald, with a height of .

References
 
 

Mountains of Liechtenstein
Mountains of Vorarlberg
Austria–Liechtenstein border
International mountains of Europe
Mountains of the Alps